Paweł Kaczmarek may refer to:

 Paweł Kaczmarek (footballer) (born 1985), Polish footballer
 Paweł Kaczmarek (canoeist) (born 1995), Polish sprint kayaker